Insyriated, released in some territories as In Syria, is a 2017 Belgian drama film directed by Philippe Van Leeuw. It was screened in the Panorama section at the 67th Berlin International Film Festival, where it won the Panoroma Audience Award. At the 8th Magritte Awards, the film won all six awards it was nominated for, including Best Film and Best Director for Van Leeuw.

Cast
 Hiam Abbass as Oum Yazan
 Diamand Bou Abboud as Halima
 Juliette Navis as Delhani
 Mohsen Abbas as Abou Monzer

Reception

Critical reception
On review aggregator website Rotten Tomatoes, the film holds an approval rating of 89% based on 45 reviews, and an average rating of 7/10. The website's critics consensus reads: "Limited in setting but impressive in scope, In Syria uses one group's experiences to offer a brilliantly effective indictments of the horrors of war."

Accolades

References

External links
 

2017 films
2017 drama films
Belgian drama films
2010s Arabic-language films
Magritte Award winners